Akki may refer to:

 Acci, Akki in Greek Latinisation, an ancient city in Spain
 Akki (Kannada: ಅಕ್ಕಿ), term for rice in the cuisine of Karnataka, India
 Akki, a Japanese legendary creature
Akki (name)

See also
Aki (disambiguation)